Tiger Inn (or "T.I." as it is colloquially known) is one of the eleven active eating clubs at Princeton University in Princeton, New Jersey.  Tiger Inn  was founded in 1890 and is one of the "Big Four" eating clubs at Princeton (the others are The Ivy Club, University Cottage Club, and Cap and Gown Club), the four oldest and most prestigious on campus. Tiger Inn is the third oldest Princeton Eating Club. Its historic clubhouse is located at 48 Prospect Avenue, Princeton, New Jersey, near the Princeton University campus. 
Members of "T.I." also frequently refer to the club as "The Glorious Tiger Inn."

The Tiger Inn clubhouse 
The Tiger Inn clubhouse is the oldest of the Princeton Eating Club houses. It is both architecturally distinct, built in the Tudor style, and historically notable. "The Clubhouse is designed in the timbered style of the 15th century and modeled especially after an old inn in Chelsea.".  The clubhouse was built in 1895 for an original club membership of 30 undergraduates. The clubhouse has been in continuous use since the facility first opened. The architect for the clubhouse's original plan was G Howard Chamberlain. According to The Tiger Inn's official history, "Princeton myth [also] credits [the original plans for the clubhouse] to Howard Crosby Butler, Class of 1892 (a [Charter] member of Tiger Inn and Princeton's first Professor of architectural history)." The clubhouse's central hall was filled with massive antique furniture presented to the club by Mrs. T. Harrison Garrett; these furnishings remain in use to this day. The funding for the original clubhouse, the land, and the club's other furnishings were provided by the club's membership, although all at the time recognized the extraordinary support and contributions of the Garrett family.

Renovations to the clubhouse have continued since it was built in 1895. During 1922–1923 a room was added to the left of the front door and the second floor was remodeled; the second floor alterations were never used for their intended purpose as members quickly converted the new portion of the second floor space to a card room. In the fall of 1926 the clubhouse was substantially improved; during the six weeks of these alterations club members were required to take their meals at the surrounding clubs. By 1928 the kitchen had been moved to the south of the building. The changes to the clubhouse from 1926 to 1928 were well timed as this coincided with an expansion of the membership. The financing of the renovations placed Tiger Inn on the firm financial footing it would need to survive the Great Depression.

The distinctive clubhouse has recently undergone renovations, improvements and enlargements as part of its “21st Century Expansion and Renovation Project,”   for which the commissioned architect was Connolly Architecture, Inc. The project was completed with the formal dedication of the new club facilities on the weekend of 11-11-11. Funded entirely by the club's alumni, the expanded facilities include a new dining hall and improvements to the spaces normally reserved for social events. The new facilities provide a more suitable building to serve the club's Active Membership, now up from 26 to over 150 in any given year, and club alumni exceeding 2000 in 2012. Fundraising for the completed project continues.

Membership 

Tiger Inn is a selective club, meaning membership is awarded after successful completion of a process called bicker. During bicker, prospective members interact with current members who then convene to vote on whether the prospective members should "receive a bid," or be invited to join the club.

The club has designated its 26 original founding members as "Charter Members:"  at the time of the club's founding, these members were known within the Princeton University community as "The Sour Balls." The Active Membership is that portion of membership that uses the clubhouse on a daily basis and is composed principally of Princeton undergraduates, although graduate students have also been active members from time to time. Alumni Members frequently return to the Tiger Inn. The club also has two honorific categories of membership to recognize and honor those who have had a positive and notable association with the club, whether as members of the Princeton University community or as individuals whose principal affiliation with the Princeton community is their association with the Tiger Inn.

Tiger Inn's membership was once described by F. Scott Fitzgerald in This Side of Paradise (1920) as "broad-shouldered and athletic, vitalized by an honest elaboration of prep-school standards."  In a 1927 essay on Princeton for the magazine College Humor, Fitzgerald elaborated: "Tiger Inn cultivates a bluff simplicity. Its membership is largely athletic and while it pretends to disdain social qualifications it has a sharp exclusiveness of its own."

Fitzgerald's comments were written during his time at Princeton University, when the membership of each of the Eating Clubs was male only. Women were not accepted as undergraduates at Princeton until 1969. Debate over co-ed Eating Club membership abounded from 1969 until 1991. In 1979, undergraduate Sally Frank filed suit against then all-male clubs Ivy Club, Cottage Club, and Tiger Inn for gender discrimination. While Cottage chose to coeducate during the intervening years, Ivy Club and Tiger Inn were forced to become co-ed organizations in 1991, after their appeal to the U.S. Supreme Court regarding Frank's lawsuit was denied. The New Jersey Supreme Court had ruled in Frank v. Ivy Club that the failure to open membership to women violated the state's anti-discrimination statute.

In modern times, the membership of The Tiger Inn is distinctly coed, and the club's membership and leadership, including members of both its Graduate Council and the undergraduate officers have included many notable Princeton alumnae and female students, respectively. In 2015 Grace Larsen was elected as the club's first female president. That same year Maria Yu was elected as treasurer, and Victoria Hammarskjold was elected as communication chair, thus making it the first time the club's undergraduate officers were gender-balanced, with three women and three men.

The full membership of the club, including all living alumni, have met four times to commemorate anniversaries of Tiger Inn. The highlight of the club's fiftieth anniversary celebration was the publication of the club's first official history, written by Charlie Mulduar and released in March 1940, just before America's involvement in World War II. The club's seventy-fifth anniversary was held on December 9, 1965, at the Hotel Roosevelt in New York.  The celebrations for the 100th anniversary of the club began in 1988 with a small informal meeting of 40 alumni at the Princeton Club of New York who began to plan the Centennial celebrations. The Centennial Celebrations peaked with the club's Hundredth Anniversary Dinner held on October 20, 1990, at the Hyatt in Princeton, following which many of the alumni insisted on continuing celebrations at the clubhouse. The Centennial celebrations were concluded by the subsequent publication of the second club history entitled The Tiger Inn of Princeton, New Jersey, 1890–1997. In February, 2016 The Tiger Inn marked its 125th Anniversary with a Dinner held at the Westin in Princeton, followed by continued celebrations at the clubhouse.

Notable contributions to sport

Olympic athletes
Tiger Inn members acted to form the first American Olympics team for the first modern Olympic games in Athens in 1896. Most of the first American Olympic team came from Princeton, Harvard University and the Boston Athletic Association. Four Princetonians, including three Tiger Inn members, participated in those games. The TI members earned six medals in total: two gold, three silver medals, and one bronze; the four Princetonians earned 7 medals in total. The three TI members were Robert Garrett, Herb Jamison and Frank Lane; they were joined by Princetonian Al Tyler, who also medalled. These four Princeton athletes' 7 medals helped the 1896 American Olympic team earn 20 medals in total. Team Member Garrett delivered the most unexpected upset of the 1896 Games when he won Gold in the Discus, outperforming his Greek rival to win the most symbolic sport carried over from the ancient Olympics to the modern Olympic games.

TI members continued to participate in the Olympics after the 1896 Athens games.  Garrett returned to the Olympics for the 1900 Paris games where he won two bronze medals. He was joined in the Paris games by John Cregan who won a silver medal in the 800 meters. John DeWitt competed in the 1904 St. Louis games; he was joined there by A. M. Woods, who earned a silver medal. 
Pete Raymond rowed in both the 1968 Mexico City and 1972 Munich games; he earned a silver medal in Munich.

Tiger Inn members have earned more than 11 Olympic medals. Garrett's lifetime record of 6 Olympic medals among Princeton athletes continues to stand.

American football
Tiger Inn members have been both Princeton football players, and professional football players. The College Football Hall of Fame lists many TI members in its ranks.

Tiger Inn alumni have returned to Princeton to serve as Head Coaches of Princeton's football program.  As college football head coaches, Tiger Inn alumni through the class of 1900 compiled composite career coaching records of 175-31-5. They coached Princeton to at least one national championship. TI members who served as Princeton Football Head Coach include Garrett Cochran, Arthur Hillebrand and Robert Casciola. TI Members have also served as Head Coaches of Football at Annapolis, Berkeley, Bowdoin,  Georgetown,  and the University of Nebraska-Lincoln, among other colleges.

Charlie Gogolak and Cosmo Iacavazzi are two prominent TI members who became professional football players.

Other American collegiate sports
Through the club's history Tiger Inn members have also featured prominently in other collegiate sports in which Princeton competes.

In 2012 the Princeton men's squash team won the National Collegiate Championship powered by the performances of three Tiger Inn members.

Notable community contributions

Academia

Tiger Inn's sole winner of a Nobel Prize, thus far, is economist Michael Spence, the winner of the 2001 Nobel Prize in Economics together with George Akerlof (a Lawrenceville graduate) and Joseph Stiglitz. During his illustrious career Spence has served as Dean of the Stanford Graduate School of Business and is presently Chairman of the Commission for Growth and Development.

Princeton University's School of Architecture was founded in 1919 through the efforts of Tiger Inn Charter Member Howard Clark Butler and his fellow faculty members. He became the School of Architecture's Director in 1920. Professor Butler was only the second Princeton Professor to offer a course related to architecture, following the precedent set by Princeton Professor Marquand.

In addition to Spence, Tiger Inn has produced well over 100 members of Phi Beta Kappa. Its members have earned at least three Rhodes, and two Marshall, Scholarships.  TI members serve as research scientists at the Bell Labs and NASA and in the research or "Think Tank" roles of such commercial organizations as international financial institutions and the BIG 4 accounting firms, among other organizations.

Tiger Inn alumni have served many universities, including Princeton, as faculty members and as non-faculty instructors and administrators. Spence has served Harvard University, New York University and Stanford University. Butler served Princeton as did noted philologist W K. Prentice. Chauncey Loomis was a Dartmouth professor, and from there, led 5 Arctic expeditions.  James Harland was a professor of classics at University of North Carolina, Chapel Hill. John Fine joined the Princeton faculty in 1940 from Yale as a professor of Classics  and retired in 1972. Richard H Williams is a professor of history at Southern Methodist University. Samuel Armistead is a professor of Spanish language and literature at UC Davis.

Sean Smith is a professor of computer science at Dartmouth. Joseph Haid is a professor at Wisconsin Polytechnique Institute.

Will Garwood continues to serve Princeton as vice chairman of advisory board to the James Madison Program  On June 12, 2012, Robert J Hugin was elected a Charter Trustee of Princeton University

Cultural contributions
Tiger Inn's members have been active in literature and the arts. Jesse Williams won the first Pulitzer Prize in Drama. Frank Taplin was President of the Metropolitan Opera in New York, the Cleveland Orchestra, and the Cleveland Institute of Music. Thomas Hoving was the Director of New York's Metropolitan Museum of Art. And Barry S Friedberg is the Chairman Emeritus of the New York City Ballet.

Jesse Williams, the author of Why Marry?, has been joined by several other Tiger Inn members as accomplished authors. William Edwards' book Football Days remains the definitive account of American Football in the 19th century. Classics Professor John Fine wrote several books, including The Ancient Greeks: A Critical History. Samuel Armistead wrote Spanish Tradition in Louisiana, which remains the definitive study on the use of the Spanish language in that state. H K Twichell wrote Regeneration in the Ruhr: The Unknown Story of a Decisive Answer to Communism in Postwar Europe.  Henry Owsley is co-author of the leading book in his field, Distressed Investment Banking: To the Abyss and Back.

Chauncey Loomis remains Tiger Inn's only Arctic explorer.

Military
Several members of the Tiger Inn have served the United States as uniformed officers of its Armed Forces. TI was founded just over 20 years after the end of the Civil War. TI members have served in the Spanish–American War, World War I, World War II, the Korean war, the Vietnam war, Desert Storm and the more recent wars in Iraq and Afghanistan, among other armed conflicts.

TI Members who served in World War I include Brigadier General Coulter, Medal of Honor recipient Gordon Johnston, and decorated World War I Flying Ace, "Ace" Vaughn.

Tiger Inn lists well over 30 members who gave their lives in the service of their country. The memory of many of these TI alums are honored through their portraits kept at the clubhouse, mainly in the upstairs Library.

Elected and appointed offices
TI members have also served their communities through various positions at the Federal, State and local levels. Tiger Inn members have served as United States Senator and United States Ambassador at the federal level, Speaker of the House in New Jersey at the state level, and Deputy Mayor of New York City at the local level. Senator John Danforth ranks as the senior-most elected politician as an Active Member of the club while a Princeton undergraduate.  United States President Grover Cleveland accepted an Honorary Membership in Tiger Inn, making him the senior-most elected politician to have joined the club in this membership category.

TI alum Louis Le Guyader is among the first candidates ever to run for the new elective office of DEPUTE to the French National Assembly from his home in New York - his new electoral district was created under a change to the French Constitution in 2008 and is meant to represent French Citizens living in the United States and Canada. As such he is the first TI member ever to seek elective office abroad.

Commerce
Arthur M Wood  was chairman and C.E.O. of Sears  and credited with its turnaround in the 1960s.  He was also responsible for the building of Sears Tower in Chicago, whose last steel beam bears his signature. George H Love led the reorganizations and turnarounds at two major corporations, the Consolidation Coal Company and The Chrysler Corporation, where he was chairman. Barry S Friedberg served as Head of investment Banking at Merrill Lynch, before its merger with Bank of America; under his leadership Merrill climbed to the top of the industry league tables in every category he managed.

Rudolph J. Schaefer ran his family's highly acclaimed Brooklyn brewery, the F & M Schaefer Brewing Company of Brooklyn, New York. His product, Schaefer Beer, was the world's best selling beer until the mid-1970s.

Robert Hugin is chairman and president of Celgene, the New Jersey pharmaceutical company. Michael Novogratz is President of the Fortress Investment Group

N.J. Nicholas Jr was president of HBO in its earliest days, president of Time Inc in 1986 and co-ceo of Time Warner in 1990. He served the GHW Bush administration on the PCEQ (presidential commission on environmental quality) and on the advisory board to the US Trade Representative. After retiring from Time Warner in 1992, he served for 15 years as a trustee of Environmental Defense Fund, including seven years as board chair.  He also served as advisory board chair of the Columbia School of Journalism.

Controversies
In 2014, two officers of the club were removed from their positions after sending emails of ridiculing women. One of the emails included a sexually explicit photograph showing a woman engaged in a sex act with a man at the Tiger Inn. The woman in the photo was called an "Asian chick" and the email contained what has been described as a "crude joke". In a second email the club's treasurer wrote about the alumna whose lawsuit forced the club to admit women: “Ever wonder who we have to thank (blame) for gender equality. Looking for someone to blame for the influx of girls? Come tomorrow and help boo Sally Frank.”

Notable members
Gerardo "Gerry" Angulo - publisher of the only English-language daily newspaper in Puerto Rico, The San Juan Star 
Samuel G. Armistead - Professor Emeritus of Spanish Language and History, UC Davis.
Ralph Bard - Under Secretary of the Navy and Assistant Secretary of the Navy during World War II, Roosevelt Administration
Dan M. Berkovitz - General Counsel of the CFTC, Obama Administration 
Walter C. Booth - known as "Bummy," an American football coach serving as the head football coach at the University of Nebraska–Lincoln (the Huskers), compiling a career record of 46-8-1.
R. Manning Brown Jr. - former chairman of the board of New York Life Insurance Co. and former chairman of Princeton University's Board of Trustees 
Howard Crosby Butler - Charter Member, one of the founders of Princeton's School of Architecture, and its Director from 1920 
Robert Casciola - Head Football Coach at Princeton from 1973 to 1977.
Grover Cleveland - Honorary Member, President of the United States.
Garrett Cochran -  head football coach at the University of California, Berkeley (1898–99), the United States Naval Academy (1900) and Princeton (1902), with a career coaching record of 29–5–3.
Richard Coulter Jr. - Charter Member, Brigadier General in the U.S. Army in WWI; professional football player
John F. Cregan - Olympic athlete; participated in the 1900 Olympic games earning a silver medal 
John Danforth - former United States Senator, Missouri; ordained priest in the Episcopal Church 
John R. DeWitt - Olympic athlete, St Louis Games of 1904; College Football Hall of Fame  
Selden Edwards - best-selling novelist, author of The Little Book and The Lost Prince, educator, and secretary of the Princeton class of '63
William Hanford Edwards - author of Football Days, the definitive work on American Football in the 19th century; famous for saving the life of N.Y. Mayor William Gaynor by tackling his assailant.
Max Farrand - Charter Member, professor, first Director of the Huntington Library, past President of the American Historical Society
 John V. A. Fine - Classics Professor at Princeton, noted author in Greek history
Barry S. Friedberg - former Executive Vice President of Merrill Lynch, and Head of Investment Banking, Chairman Emeritus of the New York City Ballet 
Robert Garrett - the first modern Olympic champion in the discus; organized the 4 Princetonians who competed in the 1896 Athens games; won two golds and two silvers in Athens, 1896, and two bronzes in Paris, 1900.
 Will Garwood - President of Cypress Asset Management and, at Princeton, vice chairman of the advisory board of the James Madison Program.
Charlie Gogolak - football placekicker noted for his innovations; initially with the Washington Redskins and then the New England Patriots
Hy Gunning - Associate Member, played professional baseball with the Boston Red Sox; he was noted for batting left-handed and throwing right-handed.
 J. P. Harland - Professor of Classics, University of North Carolina, Chapel Hill 
John Grier Hibben - honorary member; president of Princeton, 1920–32; he opposed President Wilson's plans to replace the Eating Clubs with a system of residential quadrangles.
Arthur Hillebrand - head football coach at Princeton, 1903–05, his record was 27–4 and the team out-scored opponents 669–85; the 1903 team was 11–0 and was national champion.
Thomas Hoving – former director of the Metropolitan Museum of Art
 Robert J. Hugin - chairman and President of Celgene, Inc.; elected Charter Trustee of Princeton in June 2012.
Cosmo Iacavazzi - professional football player, a member of the New York Jets; inducted into the Pro Football Hall of Fame.
Herbert Jamison - member of the first U.S. Olympic Team at the first modern Olympic games in Athens, where he won a silver medal.
Gordon Johnston -  Colonel, U.S. Army, recipient of the Medal of Honor, the highest military award of the U.S.A.; head coach of the University of North Carolina (the Tar Heels) football team in 1896.
Philip King - American football player, notable as a college football coach, especially at Georgetown University, compiling a career record of 73-14-1.
Howard Krongard - known as "Cookie;"  head of the Office of the Inspector General of the Department of State; Bush "43" Administration.
Frank A. Lane - member of the first U.S. Olympic Team in Athens, 1896; technically, the first American to compete in the modern Olympiad; bronze medal winner 
Louis Le Guyader - the first TI member to seek elective office outside the United States in a campaign to serve as a Depute in the French National Assembly in 2012 
Chauncey C. Loomis - famous Arctic explorer who led 5 expeditions to the Arctic, and Dartmouth professor.
Donald Lourie - Under Secretary of State for Administration, Eisenhower Administration; declined a pro football career with the Cleveland Browns.
Roscoe Parke McClave - Head Football Coach, Bowdoin College; twice Speaker of the House, General Assembly of New Jersey.
Albert G. Milbank - founding partner of the law firm Milbank, Tweed, Hadley & McCloy
Joshua Miller - founder of Resilient Youth Foundation as a teen; founder of startup atroundtable.com which is being referred to as "the next facebook for internet conversations among experts" 
Roland S. Morris - American Ambassador to Japan, 1917–20.
N. J. Nicholas Jr - President of HBO in its earliest days, President of Time Inc in 1986 and co-ceo of Time Warner in 1990
Michael Novogratz – president of the Fortress Investment Group
Henry Furlow Owsley III - Wall Street financier, noted as co-author of the leading book in his field, Distressed Investment Banking: To the Abyss and Back  and in 2014, "Equity Holders Under Siege: Strategies and Tactics for Distressed Businesses," Beard Books LLC
 W. K. Prentice - Princeton Professor, noted philologist.
Marc Rayman - Project Manager of Deep Space 1, NASA 
Pete Raymond - two time Olympic oarsman, won the silver medal in Munich in 1972; "a god among men."
Wayne Rogers - actor, "Trapper McIntyre" for three seasons on "M.A.S.H."
Rudolf J. Schaefer - yachtsman and brewer, ran the F & M Schaefer Brewing Company of Brooklyn, New York.
Mawell "Max" Shaw - founder of Shawskaboy inc. and the Face Morpher and Pro Interval Timer iPhone Apps.
Michael Spence - a Nobel Prize winner in Economics; Rhodes Scholar; Former Dean of the Stanford Graduate School of Business.
Robert "Huck" Alston Stevenson - Charter Member, second headmaster of the Allen-Stevenson School the private elementary school in New York City, founded by his father 
Frank E Taplin Jr. - a Rhodes Scholar; President of the Metropolitan Opera 
H. K. Twitchell - Executive director of Moral Re-Armament, an international religious movement founded in 1938 in London, where it was founded to reshape the world through absolute morality; author of "Regeneration in the Ruhr: The Unknown Story of a Decisive Answer to Communism in Postwar Europe," Princeton University Press 
George Augustus Vaughn, Jr. - known as "Ace,"  a  World War I Flying Ace: officially credited with downing 12 enemy planes and one balloon
Jesse Lynch Williams - Charter Member, prize winning author and dramatist, won the first Pulitzer Prize in drama in 1918 for the play Why Marry?
A. M. Woods - lacrosse player and Olympic Athlete, 1904 games, where he earned a silver medal.
John E. Zuccotti - former First Deputy Mayor of New York City
Zack Wall - actor, "The Village" (2004), "The Great New Wonderful" (2005), "Coda" (2014), and "SnapChat Guy" (2016).

References

External links
 Official Tiger Inn Website
History and culture of the clubs, at Princeton's official site.
 History of the Tiger Inn building

Eating clubs at Princeton University
Historic district contributing properties in Mercer County, New Jersey